Kirsten is both a given name and a surname.

Given name 
Kirsten is a female given name. It is a Scandinavian form of the names Christina and Christine.   

 Kirsten (given name)

Surname 
People with the surname Kirsten include:

Amy Beth Kirsten (born 1972), American composer
Benjamin Kirsten (born 1987), German footballer
Dorothy Kirsten (1910–1992), American opera singer
Frik Kirsten (born 1988), South African rugby union footballer
Gary Kirsten (born 1967), South African cricketer
Odine Kirsten (born 1994), South African cricketer
Peter Kirsten (born 1955), South African cricketer
Ulf Kirsten (born 1965), German footballer
Wulf Kirsten (1934-2022), German poet, novelist and writer

Other uses 
 Cameron Kirsten, a fictional character from the CBS soap opera, The Young and the Restless
 Hurricane Kirsten (disambiguation), two tropical cyclones in the Eastern Pacific Ocean

See also 
 Kirsteen
 Kirst
 Kristen
 Kirsty

References

Surnames
Surnames from given names
bg:Кирстен
pt:Kirsten